Jesu/Battle of Mice is a split EP between British post-rock band Jesu and American post-metal super group Battle of Mice. It was released through Robotic Empire on August 4, 2008. The Jesu tracks were recorded and produced by Justin Broadrick while the Battle of Mice tracks were produced by guitarist Joel Hamilton. The album was mastered by Nick Zampiello.

Track listing
”Clear Stream”, “Falling from Grace” by Jesu. “The Bishop”, “Yellow and Black” by Battle of Mice.

Personnel
Jesu
 Justin Broadrick – vocals, instrumentation, lyrics
 Diarmuid Dalton – bass (track 2)

Battle of Mice
 Tony Maimone - bass
 Joe Tomino – drums
 Joel Hamilton – guitar
 Josh Graham – guitar, keyboards, vocals
 Julie Christmas - vocals

Production
 Justin Broadrick – engineering, producer (tracks: 1, 2)
 Joel Hamilton – engineering, producer (tracks: 3, 4)
 Josh Graham – artwork
 Nick Zampiello - mastering

References

2008 EPs
Jesu (band) albums
Battle of Mice albums
Robotic Empire albums
Albums produced by Justin Broadrick
Split EPs